is a stratovolcano in the Nikkō National Park in Tochigi Prefecture, in central Honshū, the main island of Japan.

Alongside Mount Nikkō-Shirane, Mount Nantai is one of the newest volcanic edifices in the National Park. Scientific studies of the volcano's geological structure began in 1957 and have established that it was formed roughly 23,000 years ago and that its last eruption was 7000 years ago. The volcano was classified as active by the Japan Meteorological Agency in June 2017.

Since its first known ascent by Buddhist monk Shōdō Shōnin in the 8th century AD, Mount Nantai has become a sacred mountain and a site of pilgrimage in Buddhism and Shinto. As such, it is currently maintained by Futarasan jinja, a Shinto shrine whose  constitutes Mount Nantai. With Tōshō-gū and Rinnō-ji, the site forms the Shrines and Temples of Nikkō, a UNESCO World Heritage Site. Archaeological excavations conducted here from the 19th to 20th centuries have unearthed many artifacts, dating from the end of the Nara period in the 8th century AD to the Edo period from the 17th to 19th centuries. A few of these have been declared Important Cultural Properties by the Japanese Agency for Cultural Affairs.

Mount Nantai is listed among the 100 Famous Japanese Mountains as written by mountaineer and author Kyūya Fukada.

Toponymy
Literally, the two kanji characters that make up the name, 男 and 体, mean "man" and "body" respectively, and so together the combined word 男体 means "male body". Mount Nantai is said to have been the father in a family of mountain deities in Shinto, of which the neighboring Mount Nyohō is the mother and Mount Tarō the eldest son.

Trekking
The mountain is popular with hikers, and the trail to the summit starts through a gate at Futarasan Shrine's . The gate is open between 5 May and 25 October.

Mount Nantai is one of the 100 famous mountains in Japan.

Volcanic activity
In September 2008, the Japan Meteorological Agency was asked to reclassify Mount Nantai as "active" based upon work by Yasuo Ishizaki and colleagues of Toyama University showing evidence of an eruption approximately 7000 years ago.

Mount Nantai as a sacred mountain

Archaeologists affirm that during the Yayoi period the most common  (a yorishiro housing a kami) in the earliest Shinto shrines was a nearby mountain peak supplying with its streams water, and therefore life, to the plains below where people lived.

Mount Nantai constitutes Futarasan Shrine's go-shintai, and the shrine is an important example of this ancient type of mountain cult. Significantly, the name  itself means "man's body". The mountain not only provides water to the rice paddies below, but has the shape of the phallic stone rods found in pre-agricultural Jōmon sites.

See also
List of volcanoes in Japan
List of mountains in Japan

References

External links

Nantai-Nyoho Volcano Group - Geological Survey of Japan

Mountains of Tochigi Prefecture
Volcanoes of Honshū
Stratovolcanoes of Japan
Sacred mountains of Japan
Volcanoes of Tochigi Prefecture
Pleistocene stratovolcanoes
Holocene stratovolcanoes